The West-Central Africa Division (WAD) of Seventh-day Adventists is a sub-entity of the General Conference of Seventh-day Adventists, which coordinates the Church's operations in 22 African countries, which include Benin, Burkina Faso, Cameroon, Cape Verde, Central African Republic, Chad, Congo, Equatorial Guinea, Gabon, Gambia, Ghana, Guinea, Guinea-Bissau, Ivory Coast, Liberia, Mali, Mauritania, Niger, Nigeria, Senegal, Sierra Leone, and Togo. Its headquarters is in Abidjan, Côte d'Ivoire. Founded in 2003, the division membership as of June 30, 2021 is 889,196

Sub Fields
The West-Central Africa Division is divided into six Union Missions and four Union Conferences. Thes are divided into local Conferences, Missions and Regions.
Cameroon Union Mission
Adamaoua-Mayo Rey Conference
Benoue-Faro Mission
Central-South Cameroon Conference
East Cameroon Conference
Mbam-Sanaga Conference
North Cameroon Conference
Nyong-Afamba Conference
West Cameroon Conference
Central African Union Mission
Central African Republic Mission
Chad Mission
Congo Region
Equatorial Guinea Mission
Gabon Mission
Eastern Nigeria Union Conference
Aba East Conference
Aba North Conference
Aba South Conference
Aba West Mission
Abia North-Central Conference
Akwa Ibom Conference
Anambra Mission
Bayelsa Mission
Cross River Conference
Ebonyi Conference
Enugu Conference
Imo Conference
Northern Cross River Mission
Port Harcourt Conference
Rivers East Conference
Rivers West Conference
Eastern Sahel Union Mission
Benin Conference
Burkina Faso Mission
Cote d' Ivoire Conference
Niger Region 
Togo Conference
Northern Ghana Union Mission 
Ashanti Central Ghana Conference
Ashanti South Ghana Conference
Central Ghana Conference 
Green View Ghana Conference
Mid-Central Ghana Conference
Mid-North Ghana Conference
Mid-West Ghana Conference
Mountain View Ghana Conference
North Ghana Mission
South Central Ghana Conference
Northern Nigeria Union Union Conference
North Central Nigeria Conference
North East Nigeria Conference
North West Nigeria Conference
Southern Ghana Union Conference 
Accra City Conference 
Diamond Field Ghana Conference
East Ghana Conference 
Eastern View Ghana Conference
Meridian Ghana Conference 
Mid-South Ghana Conference
Pioneer Ghana Conference
South West Ghana Conference
Volta North Ghana Mission
Volta South Ghana Mission
West-Central Ghana Conference
Western North Ghana Conference
West African Union Mission
Central Liberia Mission
Guinea Region
Sierra Leone Mission
South-East Liberia Mission
South-West Liberia Conference
Western Nigeria Union Conference
Delta Conference
Edo Conference
Ekiti Conference
Kogi Region
Kwara Conference
Lagos Atlantic Conference
Lagos Mainland Conference
Ogun Conference
Ondo Mission
Osun Conference
Oyo Conference
Western Sahel Union Mission
Cabo Verde Conference
Gambia Region
Guinea-Bissau Mission
Mali Mission
Senegal/Mauritania Mission

History

See also 
Seventh-day Adventist Church in Ghana
Seventh-day Adventist Church in Nigeria
Seventh-day Adventist Church
List of Seventh-day Adventist hospitals
List of Seventh-day Adventist secondary schools
List of Seventh-day Adventist colleges and universities

References

External links

Adventist organizations established in the 20th century
Seventh-day Adventist Church in Africa